Cooperatives Europe is the European regional office of the International Co-operative Alliance and acts for cooperative enterprises in Europe. Representing 83 member organisations from 33 European countries, across all business sectors (data from 2014). Cooperatives Europe promotes the cooperative business model in Europe and advocates for a level playing field between cooperatives and other forms of enterprise. Its members represent 123 million individual member cooperators owning 160.000 cooperative enterprises and providing jobs to 5.4 million European citizens.

As part of the International Cooperative Alliance, Cooperatives Europe maintains the internationally recognised definition of a cooperative in the Statement on the Co-operative Identity which also defines seven cooperative principles. Over time, the international cooperative movement has made small readjustments to this first set of principles of the Rochdale cooperative. The most recent adjustment was made in 1995 at the Centennial Congress of the International Cooperative Alliance, when the seven cooperative principles were approved: voluntary and open membership, democratic member control, member economic participation, autonomy and independence, education, training and information, cooperation among cooperatives, and concern for the community. The new principles, while building on and refining the previously accepted ones, firmly positioned cooperatives as jointly owned and democratically controlled enterprises based on the values of self-help, self-responsibility, democracy, equality and solidarity.

On the first Saturday of July each year, Cooperatives Europe celebrates International Co-operative Day.
In December 2009, the United Nations declared 2012 as the International Year of Cooperatives.

History 

Cooperatives Europe was established on 7 March 2006 as a nonprofit organization under Belgian law (ASBL),. The first General Assembly took place in Manchester, on 11 November 2006, where Pauline Green and Etienne Pflimlin were elected co-presidents.

Since 2012, Cooperatives Europe is recognised as Civil Society Organisation, and takes therefore part in the Policy Forum on Development, organised by the European Commission’s DG DevCo. Cooperatives Europe has organised several seminars on international cooperation such as the event Cooperatives and Sustainable Development: Challenges for the Post-2015 Agenda, co-organised with CoopBuro in Brussels, among others.

Cooperatives Europe is one of the partners within the European Year for Development (EYD2015), EU’s first ever thematic year dedicated to international development cooperation. 2015 is a special year for development. It is the first ever European Year to deal with the European Union's external action and Europe’s role in the world. For development organisations all over Europe it is an unparalleled opportunity to showcase Europe's commitment to eradicating poverty worldwide and to inspire more Europeans to get engaged and involved in development. 2015 is also the year in which the Millennium Development Goals that the world agreed to reach in 2000, and in which the international community will agree on the future global framework for poverty eradication and sustainable development. See Cooperatives Europe's profile and actions on EYD2015's website.

Responding to the need of more and more young cooperators in Europe to develop contacts with peers in other countries, Cooperatives Europe has created and is developing a European network of Young Cooperators.

Structure 

Cooperatives Europe is run by a secretariat based in Brussels. Strategic guidelines are decided by the General Assembly of Cooperatives Europe, which meets at least once a year. The General Assembly elects the board of directors, which is in charge of the development and implementation of the strategic multi-annual programme, and one president, who also acts as vice-president of the International Cooperative Alliance for the European Region.

(Co) Presidents

Pauline Green (2006-2009) and Etienne Pflimlin (2006-2010)

Etienne Pflimlin and Felice Scalvini (2010-2013)

Dirk J. Lehnhoff (2013 –2017)

Jean-Louis Bancel  (2017 – 2021)

Susanne Westhausen (2021 - ongoing)

Cooperatives Europe's work 

Cooperatives Europe works to increase the knowledge of the cooperative business model across Europe and to facilitate the development of cooperative enterprises. Cooperatives Europe is registered on the European Union Transparency Register, created by the European Commission.

Cooperatives Europe’s core activities, are:

Advocating in order to grant the plurality of business forms in Europe.
Fostering communication amongst and about cooperative enterprises.
Enhancing the development of cooperative businesses.

References

External links 

Cooperatives Europe profile on the European Union Transparency Register

Cooperative federations
Organisations based in Brussels
Cooperatives in Europe